Rhyzodiastes raffrayi is a species of ground beetle in the subfamily Rhysodinae. It was described by Antoine Henri Grouvelle in 1895. It is known from the holotype collected on Halmahera, in the Maluku Islands of Indonesia. The holotype measures  in length.

References

Rhyzodiastes
Beetles of Indonesia
Endemic fauna of Indonesia
Fauna of the Maluku Islands
Fauna of Halmahera
Beetles described in 1895